Emzy Harvey "Swede" Lynch (November 16, 1895 – July 4, 1979) was an American football and basketball coach. He served as the head football coach at Northern Arizona State Teacher's College—now known as Northern Arizona University from 1926 to 1927, compiling a record of 11–3–2. Lynch was also the head basketball coach at Northern Arizona in 1926–27, tallying a mark of 17–3. He played college football at the University of Arizona.

Head coaching record

Football

References

External links
 

1895 births
1979 deaths
Arizona Wildcats football players
Basketball coaches from Texas
Northern Arizona Lumberjacks football coaches
Northern Arizona Lumberjacks men's basketball coaches
People from Hale County, Texas
Players of American football from Texas